Johan "Janne" Gustafsson (2 May 1883 – 24 September 1942) was a Swedish shooter who competed at the 1908 Summer Olympics.

In 1908 he won the silver medal in the team free rifle event. In the 300 metre free rifle competition as well as in the team military rifle event he finished fifth.

References

External links
profile

1883 births
1942 deaths
Swedish male sport shooters
ISSF rifle shooters
Olympic shooters of Sweden
Shooters at the 1908 Summer Olympics
Olympic silver medalists for Sweden
Olympic medalists in shooting
Medalists at the 1908 Summer Olympics
19th-century Swedish people
20th-century Swedish people